1918 in philosophy

Events 
August – Ludwig Wittgenstein completes his Tractatus Logico-Philosophicus.

Publications 
 William Inge – The Philosophy of Plotinus

Births 
 June 9 – John Hospers, American philosopher (died 2011)
 October 16 – Louis Althusser, French Marxist philosopher (died 1990)

Deaths 
 April 4 – Hermann Cohen, German philosopher (born 1842)
 May 30 – Georgi Plekhanov, Russian revolutionary and philosopher (born 1856)
 September 28 – Georg Simmel, German sociologist and philosopher (born 1858)

References 

Philosophy
20th-century philosophy
Philosophy by year